Buttes Chaumont is a station on Line 7bis of the Paris Métro. It is located on avenue Simon Bolivar in the 19th arrondissement, near the Parc des Buttes Chaumont, after which it was named.

History

The station opened on 13 February 1912, 13 months after the commissioning of the branch of line 7 from Louis Blanc to Pré Saint-Gervais on 18 January 1911 due to the difficulty of its construction in a backfilled quarry. As a result, the station is built with arches over each of the tracks to strengthen the station box. On 3 December 1967 this branch was separated from line 7, becoming line 7bis.

As part of the "Un métro + beau" programme by the RATP, the station was renovated and modernised on 6 May 2009.

In 2019, the station was used by 545,750 passengers, making it the 299th busiest of the Métro network out of 302 stations.

In 2020, the station was used by 242,027 passengers amidst the COVID-19 pandemic, making it the 299th busiest of the Métro network out of 305 stations.

Passenger services

Access 
The station has a single at rue Botzaris next to Parc des Buttes Chaumont.

Station layout

Platforms 
Buttes Chaumont has a standard configuration with 2 tracks surrounded by 2 side platforms. A central wall exists between the tracks due to the unstable terrain and its significant depth–its platforms are one of the deepest in the network with landings between flights of stairs leading to the platforms equipped with seats for travellers to rest. It is also equipped with elevators.

Other connections 
The station is also served by lines 26 and 71 of the RATP bus network.

Gallery

References

Paris Métro line 7bis
Paris Métro stations in the 19th arrondissement of Paris
Railway stations in France opened in 1912